God Bless Jug and Sonny is a live album by saxophonists Sonny Stitt and Gene Ammons recorded in Baltimore in 1973 and released on the Prestige label in 2001.

Reception
The Allmusic review stated "Unlike some of their 1940s/early '50s encounters, God Bless Jug and Sonny falls short of essential. But this 1973 reunion is still enjoyable and will interest the saxophonists' hardcore fans".

Track listing 
 "Blue 'n' Boogie" (Dizzy Gillespie, Frank Paparelli) - 16:36     
 "Stringin' the Jug" (Gene Ammons, Sonny Stitt) - 14:58     
 "God Bless the Child" (Billie Holiday, Arthur Herzog Jr.) - 5:48     
 "Autumn in New York" (Vernon Duke) - 5:05     
 "Ugetsu" (Cedar Walton) - 7:44     
 "Bye Bye Blackbird" (Mort Dixon, Ray Henderson) - 17:51

Personnel 
Gene Ammons - tenor saxophone (tracks 1, 2, 3 & 6)
Sonny Stitt - tenor saxophone (tracks 1, 2 & 6), alto saxophone (track 4) 
Cedar Walton - piano - trio track 5
Sam Jones - bass
Billy Higgins - drums

References 

2001 live albums
Prestige Records live albums
Gene Ammons live albums
Sonny Stitt live albums
Collaborative albums